Zadruga (eng. Cooperative) is a Serbian reality TV series broadcasting on Pink TV, as a successor of the Farm reality TV series. The first season started on 6 September 2017.

Production
Some 1,500 people works in production of this show. For scenography, consultants and technicians from Hollywood were hired. Contestants are covered with 140 cameras and viewers can follow the action from different angles. The Zadruga complex also have climate control unit, able to create different weather conditions, i.e. snow in May, rain in August etc.

Synopsis
In the show, contestants called "zadrugari" (eng. cooperators) live together in a specially-constructed community that is isolated from the outside world. The show's title refers to the term zadruga, a type of rural community in which the institution of zadruga held people's property, herds and money in common, with usually the oldest (patriarch) member ruling and making decisions for the family. Contestants are voted out (usually on a weekly basis) until only one remains and wins the cash prize. During their stay in the house, they are continuously monitored by live television cameras as well as personal audio microphones.

Concept
Each week a new leader is selected, who has responsibilities to the whole community and special benefits. He or she also has to give out budgets, which are meant for everyday use. Then the leader is supposed to choose two helpers and a favourite person. In the end of week two contestants will face the eviction. One of them is the helper with most votes received from other contestants and the other a contestant with least public votes throughout that week. On Sunday night two of them will again face public vote, but they will also play a game, which if won can double the percentage the contestant's votes and possibly save him/her from the eviction.

The complex includes the 'White House', where the contestants live, hotel, in which the leader a favourite person live, the 'Garden of Eden', where the 'Wise Tree' is placed, a supermarket, pub, casino, beauty parlour and a farm. Across the lake are the fast food restaurant, pawn shop, jail etc.

Popularity
Zadruga is considered "the most popular TV reality in the Balkans". Its predecessor, 'Farm'', was most watched in Serbia during 2010s.
Now, it is popular amongst people that Zadruga is highly controversial, with bunch of non-reality-based incidents or fights that break on during recording of "episode". Even though you'll see most people hate this show, in reality there are over 3+ million people watching Zadruga on daily basis.

Series overview

References

RTV Pink original programming
Serbian reality television series
2017 Serbian television series debuts